USS Ensign (SP-1051) was a United States Navy patrol vessel in commission from 1917 to 1919.

Ensign was built as a private motorboat of the same name in 1914. In 1917, the U.S. Navy acquired her under a free lease from her owner for use as a section patrol boat during World War I. She was commissioned on 17 September 1917 as USS Ensign (SP-1051).

Assigned to the 3rd Naval District, Ensign performed submarine net patrol duties in New York Harbor until May 1918, when was transferred to the 9th Naval District for service on the Great Lakes. Arriving at Detroit, Michigan, on 14 June 1918, she patrolled until late in 1918, when the annual freezing over of the lakes brought the 1918 Great Lakes shipping season to an end.

The Navy returned Ensign to her owner on 30 January 1919.

References

SP-1051 Ensign at Department of the Navy Naval History and Heritage Command Online Library of Selected Images: U.S. Navy Ships -- Listed by Hull Number "SP" #s and "ID" #s -- World War I Era Patrol Vessels and other Acquired Ships and Craft numbered from SP-1000 through SP-1099
NavSource Online: Section Patrol Craft Photo Archive Ensign (SP 1051)
Naval History and Heritage Command: NH 101600 USS ENSIGN (SP-1051)

Patrol vessels of the United States Navy
World War I patrol vessels of the United States
1914 ships
Great Lakes ships
Ships built in Lynn, Massachusetts